Revert Henrique Klumb (183? in (Germany) – c. 1886) was a renowned German-Brazilian photographer who operated in Brazil in the 19th century. Probably the introducer of the stereoscopic photography in the country, Klumb obtained the title of Photographo da Casa Imperial (Photographer of the Imperial House) in Rio de Janeiro. He was the author of the photography book Doze Horas em Diligência. Guia do Viajante de Petrópolis a Juiz de Fora (Twelve Hours in Expedition. Guide of the Traveler from Petrópolis to Juiz de Fora), that became one of the pioneers of the edition of photography books in Brazil.

References

External links
 Biography of Revert Klumb
 Photojournalism in Nineteenth Century Brazil: A Methodological Approach – Essay focuses on the works of Augusto Stahl and Revert Henrique Klumb

Brazilian photographers
Brazilian people of German descent